Thomas Preston may refer to:

Politicians
 Thomas Preston (MP for Derby), see Derby
 Thomas Preston (died 1604), MP for Knaresborough
 Thomas Preston of Gretton, MP for Northampton
 Thomas Preston (MP for Newcastle-under-Lyme), in 1437 MP for Newcastle-under-Lyme
 Thomas Preston, in 1452 MP for Wallingford
 Thomas Preston (of Holker, elder) (1600–1679), English MP for Lancashire
 Thomas Preston (of Holker, younger) (1647–1697), English MP for Lancaster
 Thomas Hiram Preston (1855–1925), Ontario journalist and political figure
 Thomas Hildebrand Preston, 6th Baronet (1886–1976), British diplomat

Religion
 Thomas Preston (monk) (1563–1640), English Benedictine monk
 Thomas Scott Preston (1824–1891), Roman Catholic Vicar General of New York

Others
 Thomas Preston (composer) (died c. 1563), English composer
 Thomas Preston (footballer) (1893–1971), Scottish footballer (Airdrieonians)
 Thomas Preston (writer) (1537–1598), master of Trinity Hall, Cambridge and possible author of King Cambyses
 Thomas Preston, 1st Viscount Tara (1585–1655), who fought on the side of Confederation in the Irish Confederate Wars (1642–1649)
 Thomas Preston (British Army officer), involved in the Boston Massacre in 1770
 Thomas Austin Preston, Jr. (1928–2012), poker player also known as Amarillo Slim
 Thomas Preston (scientist) (1860–1900), Irish scientist 
 Thomas J. Preston Jr. (1862–1955), professor of archeology at Princeton University
 Tommy Preston (1932–2015), Scottish footballer (Hibernian)
 Tom Preston-Werner (b 1979), American entrepreneur (GitHub)